North Down can refer to:
North Down Borough Council, former council in Northern Ireland
North Down (Assembly constituency) in Northern Ireland
North Down (Northern Ireland Parliament constituency) in Northern Ireland
North Down (UK Parliament constituency) in Northern Ireland
Electoral district of Northern Downs, in Queensland, Australia
The North Downs, a range of hills in England
Northdown (album), an album by Psapp
Northdown, Kent, formerly in Isle of Thanet Rural District, England
Northdown, Tasmania, Australia

Down North can refer to:
Down North (band), punk band from Seattle

See also
Ards and North Down Borough Council, Northern Ireland